Andréa B. Thies (born September 21, 1967), known as Dré Thies, is an American rower. She competed in the women's quadruple sculls event at the 1996 Summer Olympics.

References

External links
 

1967 births
Living people
American female rowers
Olympic rowers of the United States
Rowers at the 1996 Summer Olympics
People from Irvington, New York
Pan American Games medalists in rowing
Pan American Games silver medalists for the United States
Rowers at the 1995 Pan American Games
21st-century American women